Presidential elections were held in Chile in 1906. Conducted through a system of electors, they resulted in the election of Pedro Montt as President.

Results

References

Presidential elections in Chile
1906 in Chile
Chile
Election and referendum articles with incomplete results